The 2002 season was the Minnesota Vikings' 42nd in the National Football League, and the first under head coach Mike Tice. Tice was the third of the Vikings' six head coaches to be promoted from within the team's coaching ranks but the first to have actually played for the team.

The Vikings lost their opening game in Chicago 27–23 after surrendering a 20–10 halftime lead, and ended up going 0–4 before their bye week. Results improved after the bye, but they ultimately went 6–6 in their remaining games, including a three-game winning streak to end the season. They finished the season with a 6–10 record and missed the playoffs for the second year in a row.

Second-year running back Michael Bennett enjoyed a successful year, rushing for 1,296 yards, resulting in a Pro Bowl selection at the end of the season. After losing Cris Carter to retirement, Randy Moss had a career-high 106 receptions, but only had 7 touchdowns.

Offseason

2002 Draft

 Minnesota traded their 5th round selection (141st overall) to Cleveland for QB Spergon Wynn and RB Travis Prentice.

Undrafted free agents

Preseason

Schedule

Game summaries

Week 1: vs. Cleveland Browns

Week 2: at Buffalo Bills

Week 3: vs. Tennessee Titans

Week 4: at Pittsburgh Steelers

Regular season

Schedule

Game summaries

Week 1: at Chicago Bears

Week 2: vs. Buffalo Bills

Week 3: vs. Carolina Panthers

Week 4: at Seattle Seahawks

Week 6: vs. Detroit Lions

Week 7: at New York Jets

Week 8: vs. Chicago Bears

Week 9: at Tampa Bay Buccaneers

Week 10: vs. New York Giants

Week 11: vs. Green Bay Packers

Week 12: at New England Patriots

Week 13: vs. Atlanta Falcons

Week 14: at Green Bay Packers

Week 15: at New Orleans Saints

Week 16: vs. Miami Dolphins

Week 17: at Detroit Lions

Standings

Statistics

Team leaders

League rankings

Staff

Roster

References

External links

Minnesota Vikings seasons
Minnesota
Minnesota